A list of fiction set in Toronto, Ontario, Canada, in whole or in part.

English

Novels
Lovers and Strangers by Joyce Marshall (1957)
The Meeting Point by Austin Clarke (1967)
Cabbagetown by Hugh Garner (1968)
The Edible Woman by Margaret Atwood (1969)
Cabbagetown Diary: A Documentary by Juan Butler (1970)
A Fine and Private Place by Morley Callaghan (1975)
The Engineer of Human Souls by Josef Škvorecký (1977, Translated 1984)
Life Before Man by Margaret Atwood (1979)
The Rebel Angels by Robertson Davies (1981)
The Martyrology Book 5 by bpNichol (1982)
Fables of Brunswick Avenue by Katherine Govier (1985)
What's Bred in the Bone by Robertson Davies (1985)
In the Skin of a Lion by Michael Ondaatje (1987)
Cat's Eye by Margaret Atwood (1988)
The Lyre of Orpheus by Robertson Davies (1988)
Born To Lose (novella and stories) by Trevor Clark (author) (1989)
Killshot by Elmore Leonard (1989)
A Prayer for Owen Meany by John Irving (1989)
Barking Dogs by Terence M. Green (1989)
Losing Joe's Place by Gordon Korman (1991)
Murther and Walking Spirits by Robertson Davies (1991)
No New Land by M. G. Vassanji (1991)
Headhunter by Timothy Findley (1993)
The Robber Bride by Margaret Atwood (1993)
The Innocence of Age by Neil Bissoondath (1993)
The Cunning Man by Robertson Davies (1994)
How Insensitive by Russell Smith (1994)
Deadly by Nature by Meredith Andrew (1995)
The Terminal Experiment by Robert J. Sawyer (1995)
Moonlit Days and Nights by D. H. Toole (1995)
Alias Grace by Margaret Atwood (1996)
Fugitive Pieces by Anne Michaels (1996)
To Dance At The Palais Royale by Jane McNaughton (1996)
Blue Limbo by Terence M. Green (1997)
Buying On Time by Antanas Sileika (1997)
Where She Has Gone by Nino Ricci (1997)
"1978" by Daniel Jones (1998)
Brown Girl in the Ring Nalo Hopkinson (1998)
Factoring Humanity by Robert J. Sawyer (1998)
Noise by Russell Smith (1998)
 Flyboy Action Figure Comes With Gasmask by Jim Munroe (1999) 
A Witness to Life by Terence M. Green (1999)
Sanctuary & Other Stories by Jennifer Duncan (1999)
The Rules of Engagement by Catherine Bush (2000)
The Blind Assassin by Margaret Atwood (2000)
Calculating God by Robert J. Sawyer (2000) 
Courage My Love by Sarah Dearing (2001)
Thirsty by Dionne Brand (2001)
Margery Looks Up by Meredith Andrew (2002)
Back Flip by Anne Denoon (2002)
Making a Killing by Warren Dunford (2002)
The Neanderthal Parallax by Robert J. Sawyer
Hominids (2002)
Humans (2003)
Hybrids (2003)
Cat's Crossing by Bill Cameron (2003)
 The Double by Philip Quinn  (2003)
Doctor Bloom's Story by Don Cole (2004)
Death in the Age of Steam by Mel Bradshaw (2004)
 An opening act of unspeakable evil by Jim Munroe (2004) 
The City Man by Howard Ackler (2005)
Gently Down the Stream by Ray Robertson (2005)
What We All Long For by Dionne Brand (2005)
Someone Comes to Town, Someone Leaves Town by Cory Doctorow (2005)(available online)
The Secret Mitzvah of Lucio Burke by Steven Hayward (2005)
Bloodletting & Miraculous Cures by Vincent Lam
How Happy to Be by Katrina Onstad (2006)
Consolation by Michael Redhill (2006)
Girls Fall Down by Maggie Helwig (2008)
Barnacle Love by Anthony de Sa (2008)
Last Night in Twisted River by John Irving (2009) 
 The Victoria Nelson series by Tanya Huff
 "The Carnivore" by Mark Sinnett (2009)
 Dragging The River by Trevor Clark (2009)
 Holding Still for as Long as Possible by Zoe Whittall (2009)
 The Charlie Salter mysteries by Eric Wright
 The Jane Yeats mystery series by Liz Brady
 Ghosted by Shaughnessy Bishop-Stall (2010)
 Old City Hall by Robert Rotenberg (2010)
 Love On The Killing Floor by Trevor Clark (2010)
 Six Metres of Pavement by Farzana Doctor (2011)
 The Guilty Plea by Robert Rotenberg (2011)
 Dawn at the Royal Star by Jeff Sinasac (2011)
 Stray Bullets by Robert Rotenberg (2012)
 Kicking the Sky by Anthony de Sa (2013)
 Stranglehold by Robert Rotenberg (2013)
 Dream Caster by Najeev Raj Nadarajah (2013)
 The Cheese Stealer's Handbook by Shoshaku Jushaku (2014)
 Station Eleven by Emily St. John Mandel (2014)
 Fifteen Dogs by André Alexis (2015)
 The Unquiet Dead by Ausma Zehanat Khan (2015)
 The Society of Experience by Matt Cahill (2015)
 The Hidden Keys by Andre Alexis (2016)
 Ghost Pains by Alan Michael Beau (2016)
 The Language of Secrets by Ausma Zehanat Khan (2016)
 Heart of the City by Robert Rotenberg (2017)
 Among the Ruins by Ausma Zehanat Khan (2017)
 A Death in Sarajevo by Ausma Zehanat Khan (2017)
 A Dangerous Crossing by Ausma Zehanat Khan (2018)
 Bellevue Square by Michael Redhill (2017)
 Ayesha At Last by Uzma Jalaluddin (2018)
 The Testaments by Margaret Atwood (2019)
 A Deadly Divide by Ausma Zehanat Khan (2019)
 The Diamond Queen of Singapore by Ian Hamilton (2020) The Ava Lee Series

Graphic Novels
Jellaby: Monster in the City by Kean Soo (2009)Scott Pilgrim by Bryan Lee O'Malley (2004–2010)Skim by Mariko Tamaki (2008)

Short storiesToronto Short Stories by Morris Wolfe and Douglas Daymond (1977)Streets of Attitude: Toronto Stories by Cary Fagan and Robert MacDonald (1990)
"People One Knows: Toronto Stories" by Daniel Jones (1994)This Ain't No Healing Town by Barry Callaghan (1995)Canada Geese and Apple Chatney by Sasenarine Persaud (1998)Concrete Forest by Hal Niedzviecki (1998)Natasha and Other Stories by David Bezmozgis (2004)Stone Mattress by Margaret Atwood (2014)Immigrant City by David Bezmozgis (2019)Frying Plantain by Zalika Reid-Benta (2019)The Vinyl Cafe series by Stuart McLean
 1995 – Stories from the Vinyl Cafe 1996 – When We Were Young: A Collection of Canadian Stories 1998 – Home from the Vinyl Cafe 2001 – Vinyl Cafe Unplugged 2003 – Vinyl Cafe Diaries 2005 – Stories from the Vinyl Cafe 10th Anniversary Edition 2006 – Secrets from the Vinyl Cafe 2006 – Dave Cooks the Turkey 2009 – Extreme Vinyl Café 2010 – The Vinyl Cafe Notebooks 2012 – Revenge of The Vinyl Cafe 2013 – Time Now For The Vinyl Cafe Story Exchange 2015 – Vinyl Cafe Turns the PageTV series
 Airwaves Alias Grace The Arrow The Associates Being Erica Billable Hours Bitten Blood Ties Bloodletting & Miraculous Cures Blue Murder The Border Captain Flamingo The City Connor Undercover Cracked Da Kink in My Hair Degrassi, including:
 The Kids of Degrassi Street Degrassi Junior High Degrassi High Degrassi: The Next Generation Degrassi: Next Class The Detail Diamonds Dino Dan Dino Dana Drop the Beat E.N.G. Flashpoint Forever Knight Frankie Drake Mysteries The Great Detective Hangin' In, 1981–1987
 The Indian Detective King Kim's Convenience King of Kensington, 1975–1980
 Kenny vs. Spenny Life With Derek Liberty Street The Line The Listener Mary Kills People Material World Metropia Murdoch Mysteries The Next Step The Newsroom Nirvanna the Band the Show Once a Thief Orphan Black Our Hero Private Eyes Pure Pwnage Ransom Really Me ReGenesis Remedy Riverdale Rookie Blue Saving Hope Secret Millionaires Club Seeing Things Side Effects Straight Up Street Legal This Is Wonderland Total Drama Island Traders Train 48 Twitch City Wojeck Workin' Moms The Zack FilesFilm
 The Adjuster (1991)
 Ararat (2002)
 The Art of Woo (2001)
 Blood and Donuts (1995)
 Bon Cop, Bad Cop (2006)
 Breakfast with Scot (2007)
 Calendar (1993)
 Camilla(1994)
 Canadian Bacon (1995)
 Childstar (2004)
 Chloe (2009)
 Circle of Two (1981)
 Citizen Gangster (2011)
 Crash (1996)
 Dead Ringers (1988)
 Deadly Eyes (1982)
 Down the Road Again (2011)
 Dr. Cabbie (2014)
 Driven (2001)
 Enemy (2013)
 Every Day (2018)
 Exotica (1994)
 The F Word (2013)
 Foolproof (2003)
 Goin' Down the Road (1970)
 Going the Distance (2004)
 H (1990)
 Highpoint (1982)
 Hollywood North (2003)
 How She Move (2007)
 The Hurricane (1999)
 I've Heard the Mermaids Singing (1987)
 Ivory Tower (2010)
 Khaled (2001)
 The Kidnapping of the President (1980)
 Last Night (1998)
 Let's All Hate Toronto (2007)
 The Love Guru (2008)
 Monkey Warfare (2006)
 My Life Without Me (2003)
 Picture Day (2012)
 One Week (2008)
 Owning Mahowny (2003)
 Scott Pilgrim vs. the World (2010)
 The Silent Partner (1978)
 Sugar (2004)
 Take This Waltz (2011)
 This Movie Is Broken (2010)
 The Uncles (2000)
 Toronto Stories (2008)
 Videodrome (1983)
 When Night Is Falling (1995)

Overviews
 Greg Gatenby's Toronto: A Literary Guide (McArthur, 1999) provides an encyclopaedic literary tour of Toronto places.
 Robert Fulford’s lecture from 1996 called: "The Invention of Toronto".
 Amy Lavender Harris' Imagining Toronto (Mansfield, 2010), a comprehensive study of literary representations of Toronto.

French

NovelsDu vieux vin dans des bouteilles neuves by Frederick J. A. Davidson (1926)Ainsi parle la tour CN by Hédi Bouraoui (1999)Toronto, je t’aime by Didier Leclair (2000)Ce pays qui est le mien by Didier Leclair (2003)69, rue de la Luxure by Paul-François Sylvestre (2004)Déclic à Toronto by Mireille Messier (2004)La première guerre de Toronto by Daniel Marchildon (2010)Toronto (érotique gay) by Bravery (2012)Tila à Toronto by Jean-Baptiste Mubalutila Mbizi (2013)Les dragouilles T.16 : Les bleues de Toronto by Karine Gottot (2016)À bientôt, Toronto ! by Louis Laforce (2021)

Chinese

Novels
 Sun Bo (孙博)，《男人三十》 (Nanren sanshi) (Men in 30s)。北京：文化艺术，2000. 
 Yu Xi 余曦，《安大略湖畔》 (Andalue hupan) (The Shores of Lake Ontario)。北京：作家，2005. 
 Zhang Ling 张翎，《邮购新娘》(Dougou xinniang) (Mail order wife) 北京：作家，2004. 

Short stories
 Zhang Ling 张翎，《雁过澡溪》(Yan guo zaoxi) (四川成都：成都时代，2006.
 Zhang Ling 张翎，《盲约》(Mang yue)。广东广州：花城，2005. 
 Zhang Ling 张翎，《尘世》(Chen shi) (The world of flesh)。广西南宁：广西人民，2004. 

Hindi

Films
 Bollywood/Hollywood. Deepa Mehta, 2002.
 Kismat Konnection. Aziz Mirza, 2008.

Tamil

Films
 Arasangam'' (2008)

References
 Imagining Toronto
 Essential Toronto Reads, Reading Toronto
 

Toronto

Toronto-related lists